The Filmfare Award for Best Director – Telugu is presented by the Filmfare magazine as part of its annual Filmfare Awards South for Telugu films. The awards were extended to "Best Director" in 1972.

Superlatives

K. Viswanath has the record of winning most awards eight and winning the award twice in a row, on three separate occasions (1974–1975, 1982-1983 and 1986–1987). Both K. Raghavendra Rao and S. S. Rajamouli have received the award for four times which is the second most.
Nandini Reddy and Sripriya were the only two female directors to have been nominated for their films Ala Modalaindi (2011) and Drushyam (2014) respectively.
Krish remains the only director to have won the award for his first two films, Gamyam and Vedam.
Sukumar and Krish are the two directors who have received the award for their first film.

Winners

Nominations

Before 2000 year there have been no nominations for Filmfare Awards South in Telugu films, The panel of judges jury members are selected for winners in different Categories.

2000s
2001: Teja – Nuvvu Nenu
 B. Gopal – Narasimha Naidu
 Krishna Vamsi  – Murari
2002: Krishna Vamsi – Khadgam
Puri Jagannadh – Idiot
Teja – Jayam
V. V. Vinayak – Aadi
2003: Gunasekhar – Okkadu
Rasool Ellore – Okariki Okaru
S. S. Rajamouli – Simhadri
YVS Chowdary – Seetayya
2004: Sukumar – Arya
 K. Vijaya Bhaskar – Malliswari
 S. S. Rajamouli – Sye
 Sekhar Kammula – Anand
2005: Trivikram Srinivas – Athadu
 Muppalaneni Shiva – Sankranti
 Prabhu Deva – Nuvvostanante Nenoddantana
 Puri Jagannadh – Super
 S. S. Rajamouli – Chhatrapati
2006: Puri Jagannadh  – Pokiri
 Bhaskar – Bommarillu
 S. S. Rajamouli – Vikramarkudu
 Shekhar Kammula – Godavari
 2007: Sekhar Kammula – Happy Days
Puri Jagannadh – Desamuduru
S. S. Rajamouli – Yamadonga
Sreenu Vaitla – Dhee
Tulasiram – Mantra
2008: Krish – Gamyam
 Bhaskar – Parugu
 Ravi Babu – Nachavule
 Sreenu Vaitla – Ready
 Trivikram Srinivas – Jalsa
2009: S. S. Rajamouli – Magadheera
 Chaitanya Dantaluri – Banam
 Kodi Ramakrishna – Arundhati
 Sukumar – Arya 2
 Surendra Reddy – Kick

2010s
2010: Krish – Vedam
 Boyapati Srinu – Simha
 Gautham Vasudev Menon – Ye Maaya Chesave
 Sekhar Kammula – Leader
 Vamsi Paidipally – Brindavanam
 2011: Sreenu Vaitla – Dookudu
 Bapu – Sri Rama Rajyam
 Dasaradh – Mr. Perfect
 Nandini Reddy – Ala Modalaindi
 Sukumar – 100% Love
 2012: S. S. Rajamouli – Eega 
 Harish Shankar – Gabbar Singh
 Krish – Krishnam Vande Jagadgurum
 Puri Jagannadh – Business Man
 Trivikram Srinivas – Julayi
 2013: Trivikram Srinivas- Atharintiki Daaredi
 Koratala Siva – Mirchi
 Srikanth Addala – Seethamma Vakitlo Sirimalle Chettu
 Vijaykumar Konda – Gunde Jaari Gallanthayyinde
 Virinchi Varma – Uyyala Jampala
2014: Vikram Kumar – Manam
 Chandu Mondeti – Karthikeya
 Sripriya – Drushyam
 Sujeeth – Run Raja Run
 Surendra Reddy – Race Gurram
 2015: S. S. Rajamouli – Baahubali: The Beginning
 Koratala Siva – Srimanthudu
 Kranthi Madhav – Malli Malli Idi Rani Roju
 Krish – Kanche
 Trivikram Srinivas – S/O Satyamurthy
 2016: Vamsi Paidipally – Oopiri
 Koratala Siva – Janatha Garage
 Ravikanth Perepu – Kshanam
 Sukumar – Nannaku Prematho
 Tharun Bhascker Dhaassyam – Pelli Choopulu
 Trivikram Srinivas – A Aa
 2017: S. S. Rajamouli – Baahubali 2: The Conclusion
 Krish – Gauthamiputra Satakarni
 Sandeep Reddy Vanga – Arjun Reddy
 Sankalp Reddy – Ghazi
 Satish Vegesna – Sathamanam Bhavati
 Sekhar Kammula – Fidaa
 2018: Nag Ashwin – Mahanati
 Indraganti Mohan Krishna – Sammohanam
 Koratala Siva – Bharat Ane Nenu
 Parasuram – Geetha Govindam
 Sukumar – Rangasthalam
 Venkatesh Maha – C/o Kancharapalem

2020s
 2020–2021: Sukumar – Pushpa: The Rise
Buchi Babu Sana – Uppena
Karuna Kumar – Palasa 1978
Rahul Sankrityan – Shyam Singha Roy
Sekhar Kammula – Love Story
Trivikram Srinivas – Ala Vaikunthapurramuloo
Uday Gurrala – Mail

Notes

References
 
 
 

Director